Delta Psi Kappa was a national professional fraternity in the disciplines of health and physical education, health sciences, and recreation.

History
Phi Delta Pi merged with it in March 1970.

Both Delta Psi Kappa and Phi Delta Pi were members of the PFA.

Chapters
Chapter Listing

1916 Alpha, IUPUI
1917 Beta, Stetson University 
1918 Gamma, University of Oklahoma
1918 Delta, Posse School of Gymnastics, Kendall Green, Mass. 
1918 Epsilon, University of Southern California
1919 Zeta, Washington University in St. Louis
1919 Eta, Battle Creek School of Physical Education
1919 Theta, Panzer College, Newark, N.J. 
1920 Iota, Oregon State University
1920 Kappa, American College of Physical Education , Chicago
1920 Lambda, Chicago Normal School of Physical Ed. (Inactive) 
1920 Mu, University of Montana
1920 Nu, University of Pittsburgh
1926 Xi, Southern Methodist University
1926 Omicron, Brenau College, Gainesville, Ga. 
1927 Pi, North Dakota State College
1928 Rho, North Texas State Teachers College
1928 Sigma, George Peabody College
1928 Tau, Temple University
1929 Upsilon, University of Akron
1930 Phi, University of Wisconsin-La Crosse
1930 Chi, Northern Arizona University
1931 Psi, Ithaca School of Physical Education
1932 Omega, University of Mary Hardin–Baylor
1933 Alpha Alpha, William & Mary
1938 Alpha Beta, Moorhead State
1939 Alpha Gamma, Louisiana State
1945 Alpha Delta, Butler
1946 Alpha Epsilon, Michigan State
1946 Alpha Zeta, Kansas State (Pittsburg) 
1947 Alpha Eta, West Virginia Wesleyan
1947 Alpha Theta, South Carolina 
1948 Alpha Iota, Arkansas State (Conway)
1948 Alpha Kappa, Southwest Texas State 
1948 Alpha Lambda, Northern Illinois State 
1948 Alpha Mu, Baylor
1949 Alpha Nu North Dakota 
1950 Alpha Omicron, Kent State University, Ohio 
1952 Alpha Pi, Bowling Green State University, Ohio 
1952 Alpha Rho, Occidental College
1953 Alpha Sigma, Southwest Missouri State College, Springfield  
1953 Alpha Tau, Central Michigan College of Education, Mt. Pleasant 
1954 Alpha Upsilon, Texas Western College, El Paso
1956 Alpha Phi Slippery Rock
1958 Alpha Chi Lamar
1959 Alpha Psi Arizona
1961 Alpha Omega Kentucky
1962 Beta Alpha Northwest Missouri
1963 Beta Beta East Texas
1963 Beta Gamma Central Missouri State
1964 Beta Delta Trenton
1965 Beta Zeta West Texas
1967 Beta Eta Miami (OH)
1967 Beta Theta Central State (OK)
1968 Beta Iota Texas Tech
1968 Beta Kappa Indiana State
1968 Beta Lambda Longwood
1968 Beta Mu Grambling
1968 Beta Nu Southwestern Louisiana
1969 Beta Xi Eastern Illinois
1969 Beta Omicron Wisconsin River Falls
1969 Beta Pi Southern Connecticut
1970 Beta Rho Western Liberty
1971 Beta Sigma Texas Christian
1970 Beta Tau Miami (FL)
1970 Beta Upsilon Florida State
1970 Beta Phi Georgetown College
1971 Beta Chi Northwestern Louisiana
1972 Beta Psi Indiana
1972 Beta Omega Kansas State
1973 Gamma Alpha Nicholls
1973 Gamma Beta Georgia Southern
1973 Gamma Gamma Eastern Kentucky
1973 Gamma Delta Houston
1975 Gamma Epsilon Old Dominion
1975 Gamma Zeta V.P.I.

Chapters active as of 1946 were:

Arizona State Teachers College
Brenau College
La Crosse State Teachers College
Louisiana State University
Moorhead State Teachers College
Normal College of the North American Gymnastics Union
North Texas State Teachers College
Southern Methodist University
Temple University
University of Southern California

References

Fraternities and sororities in the United States
Professional fraternities and sororities in the United States
Student organizations established in 1916
1916 establishments in Indiana
Former members of Professional Fraternity Association